Francesco Stacchino (born February 20, 1940 in Chieri) is a retired Italian professional football player.

See also
Football in Italy
List of football clubs in Italy

References

1940 births
Living people
Italian footballers
Serie A players
Juventus F.C. players
U.S. Cremonese players
S.S.D. Sanremese Calcio players
Association football midfielders
A.S.D. La Biellese players
People from Chieri
Footballers from Piedmont
Sportspeople from the Metropolitan City of Turin